This is a list of foreign players in the Indian Super League, which commenced play in 2014. The following players must meet both of the following criteria:
Have played in at least one Indian Super League game (including finals). Players who were signed by Indian Super League clubs, but only played in cup and/or continental games, or did not play in any competitive games at all, are not included.
Are considered foreign, i.e., outside India determined by the following:
A player is considered foreign if he is not eligible to play for the national team of India.
More specifically,
If a player has been capped on international level, the national team is used; if he has been capped by more than one country, the highest level (or the most recent) team is used. 
If a player has not been capped on international level, his country of birth is used.

As of now, 89 FIFA-affiliated nations have been represented in the Indian Super League. Ukraine is the most recent to be represented with Ivan Kalyuzhnyi debuting for Kerala Blasters on 7 October 2022. 

In bold: players who currently plays in the Indian Super League.

Details correct as of 29 January 2023

Current season

Africa (CAF)

Botswana 
Ofentse Nato – ATK – 2014–16
Saidou Panandetiguiri – Pune City – 2014

Burkina Faso 
Bakary Koné – Kerala Blasters – 2020–21

Cameroon 
Eric Djemba-Djemba – Chennaiyin – 2014
André Bikey – NorthEast United, Pune City, Jamshedpur, ATK – 2015–19
Achille Emaná – Mumbai City – 2017–18
Raphaël Messi Bouli – Kerala Blasters – 2019–20
Yaya Banana – Bengaluru – 2021–22

Cape Verde 
Valdo – ATK – 2015
Odair Fortes – NorthEast United – 2017–18

Chad 
Azrack Mahamat – Kerala Blasters – 2016

Congo 
Prince Ibara – Bengaluru – 2021–

Democratic Republic of Congo 
Arnold Issoko – Mumbai City – 2018–19
Jacques Maghoma – East Bengal – 2020–21
Kule Mbombo – NorthEast United – 2023–

Equatorial Guinea 
Iván Bolado – Pune City – 2014
Eduardo Ferreira – Pune City – 2016

Ethiopia 
Fikru Teferra – ATK, Chennaiyin – 2014–15

Gabon 
Sèrge Kevyn – Mumbai City – 2019–20
Yrondu Musavu-King – Bengaluru – 2021–22

Ghana 
Francis Dadzie – NorthEast United – 2015
Richard Gadze – Delhi Dynamos – 2015–16
David Addy – Delhi Dynamos – 2016
Asamoah Gyan – NorthEast United – 2019–20
Augustine Okrah – NorthEast United – 2018–19
Courage Pekuson – Kerala Blasters – 2017–19
Kwame Karikari – Chennaiyin – 2022–
Kwesi Appiah – NorthEast United – 2020–21

Guinea 
Idrissa Sylla – NorthEast United – 2020–21
Florentin Pogba – ATK Mohun Bagan – 2022

Guinea Bissau 
Sambinha – NorthEast United – 2017–18
Esmaël Gonçalves – Chennaiyin – 2020–21

Ivory Coast 
Didier Kadio – Kerala Blasters – 2016
Didier Zokora – Pune City, NorthEast United – 2015–16
Romaric – NorthEast United – 2016

Mali 
Dramane Traoré – Pune City – 2016
Mohamed Sissoko – Pune City – 2016

Mauritania 
Khassa Camara – NorthEast United, Hyderabad – 2020–22

Morocco 
Ahmed Jahouh – Goa, Mumbai City – 2017– 
Noussair El Maimouni – ATK – 2018–19
Zaid Krouch – Goa – 2018–19
Noah Sadaoui – Goa – 2022–

Nigeria 
 
Bright Enobakhare – East Bengal – 2021
Daniel Chima – East Bengal, Jamshedpur – 2021–
Dudu Omagbemi – Pune City, FC Goa, Chennaiyin – 2014–16
Bartholomew Ogbeche – NorthEast United, Kerala Blasters, Mumbai City, Hyderabad – 2018– 
Izu Azuka – Jamshedpur – 2017–18
Jude Nworuh – Chennaiyin – 2017–18
Kalu Uche – Pune City, Delhi Dynamos, ATK – 2015, 2017–19 
Penn Orji – Kerala Blasters – 2014
Ranti Martins – Goa – 2014
Stephen Eze – Jamshedpur – 2020–21

Senegal 
Badara Badji – Delhi Dynamos – 2016
Diawandou Diagne – Odisha – 2019–20 
Diomansy Kamara – NorthEast United – 2015
Elhadji Ndoye – Kerala Blasters – 2016
Fallou Diagne – Chennaiyin – 2022–
Ibrahima Niasse – Delhi Dynamos – 2016
Massamba Sambou – NorthEast United – 2014
Modou Sougou – Mumbai City – 2018–20
Momar Ndoye – Pune City – 2016
Mourtada Fall – Goa, Mumbai City – 2018–
Moustapha Gning – Kerala Blasters – 2019–20
Talla N'Diaye – Jamshedpur – 2017–18
Victor Mendy – NorthEast United – 2015

South Africa 
Sameehg Doutie – ATK, Jamshedpur – 2015–16, 2017–18
Sibongakonke Mbatha – ATK – 2017–18
Cole Alexander – Odisha – 2020–21

Tunisia 
Selim Benachour – Mumbai City – 2015
Amine Chermiti – Mumbai City – 2019–20
Mohamed Larbi – Mumbai City – 2019–20

Uganda 
Kizito Keziron – Kerala Blasters – 2017–19

Zambia 
Isaac Chansa – NorthEast United – 2014
Kondwani Mtonga – NorthEast United – 2014

Zimbabwe 
Costa Nhamoinesu – Kerala Blasters – 2020–21

Asia (AFC)

Afghanistan 
Zohib Islam Amiri – Goa – 2014
Masih Saighani – Chennaiyin – 2019–20

Australia 
Andrew Barisic – Kerala Blasters – 2014
Apostolos Giannou – Kerala Blasters – 2022–2021
Brad Inman – ATK Mohun Bagan, Odisha, Mumbai City – 2020–22
Brendan Hamill – ATK Mohun Bagan – 2022–
Chris Herd – Chennaiyin – 2018–19
David Williams – ATK, ATK Mohun Bagan – 2019–22
Dimitri Petratos – ATK Mohun Bagan – 2022–
Dylan Fox – NorthEast United, Goa – 2020–22
Eli Babalj – ATK – 2018–19
Aleksandar Jovanovic – Bengaluru – 2022–
Erik Paartalu – Bengaluru – 2017–21
Jacob Tratt – Odisha – 2020–21
James Donachie – Goa – 2020–21
Joel Chianese – Hyderabad – 2020–
Jordan Murray – Kerala Blasters, Jamshedpur – 2020–22 
Jordan O'Doherty – East Bengal – 2022–
Nick Fitzgerald – Jamshedpur – 2020–21
Osama Malik – Odisha – 2022–
Rostyn Griffiths – Mumbai City – 2022–
Scott Neville – East Bengal – 2020–21
Harry Sawyer – Jamshedpur – 2022–
Tim Cahill – Jamshedpur – 2018–19
Tolgay Özbey – Goa – 2014
Tomislav Mrčela – East Bengal – 2021–22
Aaron Evans – NorthEast United – 2022–

Bhutan 
Chencho Gyeltshen – Bengaluru, Kerala Blasters – 2018–19, 2021–22

Iran 
Iman Basafa – Bengaluru – 2021–22
Vafa Hakhamaneshi – Chennaiyin – 2022–

Japan 
Katsumi Yusa – NorthEast United – 2016
Robert Cullen – NorthEast United – 2016
Cy Goddard – Mumbai City – 2020–21

Kyrgyzstan 
Mirlan Murzaev – Chennaiyin – 2021–22

Malaysia 
Liridon Krasniqi – Odisha – 2021–22

Nepal 
Ananta Tamang – East Bengal – 2022

Palestine 
Carlos Salom – Chennaiyin – 2018–19

South Korea 
Do Dong-hyun – NorthEast United – 2014
Park Kwang-il – Pune City – 2014

Syria 
Fares Arnaout – Goa – 2022–

Tajikistan 
Fatkhullo Fatkhuloev – Chennaiyin – 2020–21

Europe (UEFA)

Armenia 
Apoula Edel – ATK, Chennaiyin, Pune City – 2014–16

Austria 
Marko Stanković – Pune City, Hyderabad – 2017–19
Marco Sahanek – NorthEast United – 2022

Belgium 
Benjamin Lambot – NorthEast United – 2020–21
Kristof Van Hout – Delhi Dynamos – 2014
Wim Raymaekers – Delhi Dynamos – 2014

Bosnia and Herzegovina 
Enes Sipović – Chennaiyin, Kerala Blasters – 2020–22

Bulgaria 
Dimitar Berbatov – Kerala Blasters – 2017–18

Croatia 
Antonio Perošević – East Bengal – 2021–22
Franjo Prce – East Bengal – 2021–22
Marko Lešković – Kerala Blasters – 2021–
Mato Grgić – NorthEast United, Mumbai City – 2018–20
Mislav Komorski – NorthEast United – 2018–20
Petar Sliskovic – Chennaiyin – 2022–

Cyprus 
Charalambos Kyriakou – East Bengal – 2022–

Czech Republic 
Jakub Podaný – ATK – 2014
Jan Šeda – Goa – 2014
Jan Štohanzl – Mumbai City – 2014
Marek Čech – Delhi Dynamos – 2014
Miroslav Slepička – Goa – 2014
Pavel Čmovš – Mumbai City – 2014–15
Pavel Eliáš – Delhi Dynamos – 2014
Tomáš Josl – NorthEast United – 2014

Denmark 
Mads Junker – Delhi Dynamos – 2014
Morten Skoubo – Delhi Dynamos – 2014
Michael Jakobsen – NorthEast United – 2022

England 
Adam Le Fondre – Mumbai City – 2020–21
Adil Nabi – Delhi Dynamos – 2015
Antonio German – Kerala Blasters – 2015–16
Carl Baker – ATK – 2017–18
Chris Dagnall – Kerala Blasters – 2015
Conor Thomas – ATK – 2017–18
David James – Kerala Blasters – 2014
Gary Hooper – Kerala Blasters – 2020–21
James Bailey – Pune City – 2015
James Keene – NorthEast United – 2014
Jermaine Pennant – Pune City – 2014
John Johnson – Bengaluru, ATK – 2017–20 
Marcus Williams – Kerala Blasters – 2015
Matt Mills – Pune City – 2018–19
Matthew Kilgallon – Hyderabad – 2019–20
Michael Chopra – Kerala Blasters – 2014, 2016
Nicky Shorey – Pune City – 2015
Paul Rachubka – Kerala Blasters – 2017–18
Peter Hartley – Jamshedpur – 2020–2022 
Peter Ramage – Kerala Blasters – 2015
Roger Johnson – Pune City – 2015
Ryan Taylor – ATK – 2017–18
Steve Simonsen – Pune City – 2015
Steven Bywater – Kerala Blasters – 2015
Steven Taylor – Odisha – 2020–21
Tom Thorpe – ATK – 2017–18
Wes Brown – Kerala Blasters – 2017–18
Matt Derbyshire – NorthEast United – 2022
Jay Emmanuel-Thomas – Jamshedpur – 2022–
Jake Jervis – East Bengal – 2023–

Finland 
Joni Kauko – ATK Mohun Bagan – 2021–
Jussi Jääskeläinen – ATK – 2017–18
Njazi Kuqi – ATK – 2017–18

France 

Bernard Mendy – Chennaiyin – 2014–16
Cédric Hengbart – Kerala Blasters, NorthEast United – 2014–16
Cyril Kali – Kerala Blasters – 2018–19
David Trezeguet – Pune City – 2014
Florent Malouda – Delhi Dynamos – 2015–16
Gennaro Bracigliano – Chennaiyin, NorthEast United – 2014–15
Hugo Boumous – Goa, Mumbai City, ATK Mohun Bagan – 2018–
Johan Letzelter – Mumbai City – 2014
Mikaël Silvestre – Chennaiyin – 2014
Romain Philippoteaux – NorthEast United – 2022– 
Nicolas Anelka – Mumbai City – 2014–15
Raphaël Romey – Kerala Blasters – 2014
Robert Pires – Goa – 2014
Sylvain Monsoreau – ATK – 2014
Youness Bengelloun – Goa – 2014
Zakaria Diallo – NorthEast United – 2021–22

Germany 
Julius Düker – Chennaiyin – 2022–
Manuel Friedrich – Mumbai City – 2014
Matti Steinmann – East Bengal – 2020–21

Greece 
Dimitrios Diamantakos – Kerala Blasters – 2022–
Alexandros Tzorvas – NorthEast United – 2014
Ilias Pollalis – Mumbai City – 2014
Kostas Katsouranis – Pune City – 2014
Panagiotis Triadis – NorthEast United – 2018–19

Hungary 
Krisztián Vadócz – Pune City, Mumbai City – 2014, 2016
Vladimir Koman – Chennaiyin – 2021–22

Iceland 
Gudjon Baldvinsson – Kerala Blasters – 2017–18

Ireland 
Andy Keogh – NorthEast United – 2019–20
Anthony Pilkington – East Bengal – 2020–21
Carl McHugh – ATK, ATK Mohun Bagan – 2019–
Colin Falvey – Kerala Blasters – 2014
Darren O'Dea – Mumbai City – 2015
Graham Stack – Kerala Blasters – 2016
Robbie Keane – ATK – 2017–18

Italy 
Alessandro Del Piero – Delhi Dynamos – 2014
Alessandro Nesta – Chennaiyin – 2014
Alessandro Potenza – Chennaiyin – 2016
Andrea Orlandi – Chennaiyin – 2018–19
Bruno Cirillo – Pune City – 2014
Daniele Magliocchetti – Pune City – 2014 
Davide Colomba – Pune City – 2014
Davide Succi – Chennaiyin – 2016
Emanuele Belardi – Pune City – 2014
Francesco Franzese – Chennaiyin – 2014
Manuele Blasi – Chennaiyin – 2015–16
Marco Materazzi – Chennaiyin – 2014
Maurizio Peluso – Chennaiyin – 2016

Lithuania 
Nerijus Valskis – Chennaiyin, Jamshedpur – 2019–22

North Macedonia 
Vlatko Drobarov – Kerala Blasters – 2019–20

Malta 
André Schembri – Chennaiyin – 2019–20

Montenegro 
Slavko Damjanović – Chennaiyin, ATK Mohun Bagan – 2021–22, 2023–

Netherlands 
Abdenasser El Khayati – Chennaiyin – 2022–
Darren Sidoel – East Bengal – 2021–22 
Gianni Zuiverloon – Delhi Dynamos – 2018–20
Gregory Nelson – Chennaiyin – 2017–19
Hans Mulder – Delhi Dynamos, Chennaiyin – 2014–16
Jeroen Lumu – Delhi Dynamos – 2017–18
John Goossens – Pune City – 2014
Kai Heerings – NorthEast United – 2019–20
Mark Sifneos – Kerala Blasters, Goa – 2017–18
Serginho Greene – Delhi Dynamos – 2015
Stijn Houben – Delhi Dynamos – 2014
Wesley Verhoek – Pune City – 2015

Northern Ireland 
Aaron Hughes – Kerala Blasters – 2016
Martin Paterson – ATK – 2017–18

Norway 
John Arne Riise – Delhi Dynamos, Chennaiyin – 2015–16
Kristian Opseth – Bengaluru – 2020–21

Poland 
Ariel Borysiuk – Chennaiyin – 2021–22
Łukasz Gikiewicz – Chennaiyin – 2021–22

Portugal 
André Preto – Mumbai City – 2014
Bruno Pinheiro – Goa – 2014, 2017–18
Edgar Marcelino – Goa – 2014
Hélder Postiga – ATK – 2015–16
Hélio Pinto – NorthEast United – 2017–18
Henrique Dinis – Delhi Dynamos – 2014
Henrique Sereno – ATK, Chennaiyin – 2016–18
João Coimbra – Kerala Blasters – 2015
José Gonçalves – NorthEast United – 2017–18
Luís Machado – NorthEast United – 2020–21
Miguel Garcia – NorthEast United – 2014
Miguel Herlein – Goa – 2014
Paulo Machado – Mumbai City – 2018–20
Silas – NorthEast United – 2015
Simão Sabrosa – NorthEast United – 2015
Tiago Ribeiro – Mumbai City – 2014
Zequinha – ATK – 2017–18

Romania 
Adrian Mutu – Pune City – 2015
Dragoș Firțulescu – Chennaiyin – 2019–20
Lucian Goian – Mumbai City, Chennaiyin – 2016–20

Scotland 
Danny Fox – East Bengal – 2020–21
Greg Stewart – Jamshedpur, Mumbai City – 2021–
Jamie McAllister – Kerala Blasters – 2014 
Stephen Pearson – Kerala Blasters, ATK – 2014, 2016

Serbia 
Andrija Kaluđerović – Delhi Dynamos – 2018–19
Damir Grgič – Pune City – 2017–18
Dejan Lekić – ATK – 2015
Marko Klisura – Mumbai City – 2018–19
Nemanja Lakić-Pešić – Kerala Blasters – 2017–19
Nikola Krčmarević – Kerala Blasters – 2018–19
Slaviša Stojanović – Kerala Blasters – 2018–19

Slovakia 
Jakub Sylvestr – Chennaiyin – 2020–21

Slovenia 
Amir Dervišević – East Bengal – 2021–22
Matej Poplatnik – Kerala Blasters – 2018–19
Rene Mihelič – Chennaiyin, Delhi Dynamos – 2017–19

Spain 
Adrià Carmona – Delhi Dynamos – 2018–19
Adrián Colunga – Goa – 2017–18
Agus Garcia –ATK – 2019–20
Airam Cabrera – Goa – 2021–22
Aitor – Mumbai City – 2015
Aitor Monroy – Jamshedpur – 2019–21
Albert Serrán – Bengaluru – 2018–20
Alberto Noguera – Goa, Mumbai City – 2020–
Álex Barrera – Bengaluru – 2018–19
Álvaro Vázquez – Kerala Blasters, Goa – 2021–
Aridai Cabrera – Odisha – 2021–
Aridane Santana – Odisha – Hyderabad – 2019–21
Arnal Llibert – ATK – 2014
Basilio Agudo –ATK – 2014
Borja Fernández – ATK – 2014–16
Bruno –Delhi Dynamos, NorthEast United, Pune City – 2014–16
Carlos Calvo – Jamshedpur – 2018–20
Carlos Delgado – Odisha – 2019–20, 2022–
Carlos Marchena – Kerala Blasters – 2015
Carlos Peňa – Goa – 2018–20
Sergio Juste – Goa – 2017–18
Coro – Goa – 2017–20
Cristian Bustos – Mumbai City – 2015
Cristian Hidalgo – Chennaiyin – 2014
Dani Mallo – ATK – 2016
Daniel Lucas Segovia – Bengaluru – 2017–18
David Grande – Jamshedpur – 2019–21
Dimas Delgado – Bengaluru – 2017–21
Edu Bedia – Goa – 2017–
Edu García – Bengaluru, ATK, ATK Mohun Bagan, Hyderabad – 2017–18, 2018–22
Edu Moya – Delhi Dynamos – 2017–18
Francisco Dorronsoro – Odisha – 2018–20
Fran González – Bengaluru – 2020–21
Francisco Sandaza – Hyderabad – 2020–21
Hector Rodas – Odisha – 2021–22
Hernán Santana – Mumbai City, NorthEast United, Goa – 2020–22, 2023–
Igor Angulo – Goa, Mumbai City – 2020–22
Iñigo Calderón – Chennaiyin – 2017–19
Iván Garrido González – Goa, East Bengal – 2020–
Jaime Gavilán – ATK, Chennaiyi  – 2015, 2017–18
Javi Fernández – Mumbai City – 2014
Javi Hernandez – ATK, ATK Mohun Bagan, Odisha, Bengaluru – 2019–
Javi Lara – ATK – 2016
Javier Siverio – Hyderabad – 2021–
Jesús Tato – Pune City – 2016
Joan Capdevila – NorthEast United – 2014
Jofre Mateu – ATK, Goa – 2014–16
Jonathan Vila – Pune City – 2018–19
Jordi Figueras – ATK – 2017–18
Jorge Alonso – ATK – 2015
Jorge Ortiz – Goa – 2020–22
Joseba Beitia – NorthEast United – 2023–
Josemi – ATK – 2014
Josu – Kerala Blasters – 2015–16
Juan Aguilera – Mumbai City – 2015
Juan Belencoso – ATK – 2016
Juan Calatayud – ATK – 2015
Juanan – Bengaluru, Hyderabad – 2017–22
Juande – Kerala Blasters – 2021
Koke – NorthEast United – 2014
Lluís Sastre – Hyderabad – 2020–21
Lolo – Pune City – 2017–18
Luis García – ATK – 2014
Luisma – Bengaluru – 2018–19
Mandi – ATK – 2019–20
Manuel Arana – Goa, Delhi Dynamos –2017–18
Manuel Lanzarote – Goa, ATK, Chennaiyin – 2017–19, 2021 
Manuel Onwu – Bengaluru, Odisha – 2019–21
Marcos Tébar – Odisha, Pune City – 2016–20
Mario Arqués – Jamshedpur, Kerala Blasters – 2018–20
Martí Crespí – Delhi Dynamos – 2018–19
Miguel Palanca – Delhi Dynamos – 2018–19
Nili – Bengaluru – 2019–20
Noé Acosta – Jamshedpur – 2019–20
Néstor Gordillo – Hyderabad – 2019–21
Odei Onaindia – Hyderabad – 2020–21, 2022–
Pablo Morgado Blanco – Jamshedpur – 2018–19
Pablo Pérez – Bengaluru – 2022–
Pitu – Pune City – 2016
Piti – Jamshedpur – 2019–20
Pulga – Kerala Blasters – 2014–15, 2017–18
Rafa – Pune City, Hyderabad – 2017–18, 2019–20
Rafa Jordá – Mumbai City – 2017–18
Rubén González Rocha – Delhi Dynamos – 2016
Sergio Castel – Jamshedpur – 2019–20
Sergio Cidoncha – Jamshedpur, Kerala Blasters – 2018–21
Tiri – ATK, Jamshedpur, ATK Mohun Bagan – 2015–
Toni Doblas – Delhi Dynamos – 2015–16
Toni Dovale – Bengaluru – 2017–18
Víctor Mongil – ATK, Odisha, Kerala Blasters – 2019–20, 2021–
Victor Pérez – Bengaluru – 2017–18
Vicente Gómez Umpiérrez – Kerala Blasters – 2020–21
Xabi Irureta – Delhi Dynamos – 2017–18
Xisco Hernandez – Bengaluru, Odisha – 2019–21

Sweden 
Bojan Djordjic – Chennaiyin – 2014
Freddie Ljungberg – Mumbai City – 2014
Maic Sema – NorthEast United – 2017–18
Simon Lundevall – NorthEast United – 2019–20

Turkey 
Tuncay Şanlı – Pune City – 2015

Ukraine 
Ivan Kalyuzhnyi – Kerala Blasters – 2022–

Wales 
Aaron Amadi-Holloway – East Bengal – 2020–21
David Cotterill – ATK – 2017–18

North and Central America, Caribbean (CONCACAF)

Candada 

Iain Hume – Kerala Blasters, ATK, Pune City – 2014–19

Costa Rica 
Yendrick Ruiz – Pune City – 2015

Curaçao 
Guyon Fernandez – Delhi Dynamos – 2017–18

Haiti 
Duckens Nazon – Kerala Blasters – 2016
Frantz Bertin – Mumbai City – 2015
Jean-Eudes Maurice – Chennaiyin – 2014
Kervens Belfort – Kerala Blasters, Jamshedpur – 2016–18
Sony Norde – Mumbai City – 2015–15

Jamaica 
Duwayne Kerr – Chennaiyin – 2015
Giles Barnes – Hyderabad – 2019–20
Kevaughn Frater – Bengaluru – 2019–20
Deshorn Brown – Bengaluru, NorthEast United – 2019–21

Martinique 
Frédéric Piquionne – Mumbai City – 2015
Grégory Arnolin – Goa – 2014–15
Mathias Coureur – NorthEast United – 2021

Mexico 
Aníbal Zurdo – Pune City – 2016
Ulises Dávila – Delhi Dynamos – 2018–19

Suriname 
Roland Alberg – Hyderabad – 2021

Trinidad and Tobago 
Cornell Glen – NorthEast United – 2014

South America (CONMEBOL)

Argentina 
Carlos Javier López – NorthEast United – 2015
Diego Colotto – Pune City – 2015
Diego Nadaya – Mumbai City – 2014
Facundo Cardozo – Mumbai City – 2016
Facundo Pereyra – Kerala Blasters – 2020–21
Gastón Sangoy – Mumbai City – 2016
Gustavo Oberman – Pune City – 2016
Jorge Pereyra Díaz – Kerala Blasters, Mumbai City – 2021–
Martín Pérez Guedes – Odisha – 2019–20
Matías Defederico – Mumbai City – 2016
Maximiliano Barreiro – NorthEast United – 2019–20
Nicolás Vélez – NorthEast United – 2015–16
Robertino Pugliara – Pune City – 2017–18

Brazil 
Alan Costa – Bengaluru – 2021–
Alex Lima – Jamshedpur, East Bengal – 2020–
André Moritz – Mumbai City – 2014–15
André Santos – Goa – 2014
Bobô – Hyderabad – 2019–20
Bruno Pelissari – Chennaiyin, Delhi Dynamos – 2014–16
Bruno Perone – Kerala Blasters – 2015
Bruno Ramires – Bengaluru – 2021–
Cafu – Mumbai City – 2016
Cássio Gabriel – Mumbai City – 2021–22
Chicão – Delhi Dynamos – 2015
Cleiton Silva – Bengaluru, East Bengal – 2020–
Danilo – NorthEast United – 2017–18
Diego Carlos – Pune City, Mumbai City – 2017–20
Diego Maurício – Odisha, Mumbai City – 2020–21, 2022–
Éder Monteiro – Chennaiyin – 2015–16
Elano – Chennaiyin – 2014–15
Eli Sabiá – Chennaiyin, Jamshedpur – 2016, 2018–
Elinton Andrade – Goa – 2015
Erwin Spitzner – Kerala Blasters – 2014
Éverton Santos – Mumbai City, ATK – 2017–19
Gerson Vieira – Mumbai City, ATK – 2016–19
Guilherme Batata – NorthEast United – 2014
Gustavo Lazzaretti – NorthEast United – 2016
Gustavo Marmentini – Delhi Dynamos – 2015
João Victor – Hyderabad – 2020–
Jonatan Lucca – Goa, Pune City – 2015–18
Jonathas de Jesus – Odisha – 2021–22
Júlio César – Goa – 2016
Léo Costa – Mumbai City – 2017–18
Léo Moura – Goa – 2015
Luciano Sabrosa – Goa – 2015–16
Lúcio – Goa – 2015–16
Maílson Alves – Chennaiyin, NorthEast United – 2015–19
Marcelinho – Odisha, Pune City, Hyderabad, ATK Mohun Bagan, NorthEast United – 2016–22
Marcinho – NorthEast United – 2017–18
Márcio Rosário – Mumbai City – 2017–18
Matheus Gonçalves – Goa, Jamshedpur – 2016–18
Memo – Delhi Dynamos, Jamshedpur, Chennaiyin – 2016–21
Paulinho Dias – Delhi Dynamos – 2017–18
Rafael Bastos – Mumbai City – 2018–19
Rafael Coelho – Goa – 2015–16
Rafael Dumas – Goa – 2016
Rafael Crivellaro – Chennaiyin, Jamshedpur – 2019–2022, 2022–
Raphael Augusto – Chennaiyin, Bengaluru – 2015–20
Richarlyson – Goa – 2016
Reinaldo – Goa – 2015–16
Roberto Carlos – Delhi Dynamos – 2015
Roberto Volpato – Mumbai City – 2016
Rodrigo Arroz – Kerala Blasters – 2015
Thiago Cunha – Mumbai City – 2016
Thiago Santos – Mumbai City – 2017–18
Vinícius – Delhi Dynamos – 2015
Wellington de Lima Gomes – NorthEast United – 2016
Wellington Priori – NorthEast United, Jamshedpur – 2016–18, 2022
Ygor Catatau – Mumbai City – 2021
Eliandro – East Bengal – 2022

Colombia 
Andrés González – Pune City – 2014
Jairo Suárez – Chennaiyin – 2014
Janeiler Rivas Palacios – NorthEast United – 2018–19
John Mosquera – NorthEast United – 2017–18
Wilmar Jordán Gil – NorthEast United – 2022–
José David Leudo – NorthEast United – 2018–20
Luis Yanes – NorthEast United – 2014
Omar Andrés Rodríguez – Pune City – 2014
Stiven Mendoza – Chennaiyin – 2014–15

Uruguay 
Adrián Luna – Kerala Blasters – 2021–
Emiliano Alfaro – NorthEast United, Pune City, ATK – 2016–19
Federico Gallego – NorthEast United, ATK Mohun Bagan – 2018–22, 2023–
Juan Cruz Mascia – NorthEast United – 2018–19
Martín Cháves – NorthEast United – 2019–20
Martin Diaz – NorthEast United, Pune City – 2017–19
Matías Mirabaje – Delhi Dynamos, Mumbai City – 2017–19
Sasha Aneff – NorthEast United – 2016

Venezuela 
Gabriel Cichero – Delhi Dynamos – 2017–18
Miku – Bengaluru – 2017–19

Oceania (OFC)

Fiji 
Roy Krishna – ATK, ATK Mohun Bagan, Bengaluru – 2019–

New Zealand 
Leo Bertos – NorthEast United – 2014

Notes

See also
 List of Indian Super League records and statistics 
 List of Indian Super League seasons 
 List of Indian Super League owners 
 List of Indian Super League head coaches 
 Indian Super League attendance 
 List of Indian Super League hat-tricks 
 List of foreign football players in India

References

ISL players, foreign
Indian Super League lists
India
 
Association football player non-biographical articles